The Gornje Obrinje massacre refers to the killing of 21 Kosovo Albanians, belonging to the same family, in a forest outside the village of Donje Obrinje on 26 September 1998 by Serbian Police Forces during the Kosovo War. Among the victims were women and children. 

The Yugoslav Army had been deployed in the area for several months in a major offensive against the Kosovo Liberation Army (KLA), which had assumed loose control of an estimated one-third of the province. There was serious combat in the areas of Suva Reka and Drenica. At least 14 policemen had been killed by the KLA earlier that month. On 25 September, a Serbian police vehicle was blown up by a detonation on the road between Likovac and Gornje Obrinje, with five dead. The KLA sometimes retreated through villages after their frequent attacks on Serbian police, moving in proximity to civilians. According to HRW, the Serbian special police retaliated by killing 21 civilians, belonging to the family of Deliaj from Donje Obrinje, on 26 September. Among these were 9 women and 5 children. They had been executed in a nearby forest. Later that same day, 14 men were randomly selected some kilometres from Gornje Obrinje, abused for several hours, then eventually 13 were executed in Golubovac. On 27 September HRW researchers and journalists arrived at the village and documented the massacre, garnering major Western media coverage.

International political pressure on the FR Yugoslav government to end its crackdown in Kosovo was accelerated by the news of these killings, leading to a new resolution issued by the United Nations Security Council on 24 October 1998, calling for the deployment of the Diplomatic Verification Mission and an end to hostilities.

See also
 Kosovo War
 War crimes in the Kosovo War
 List of massacres in the Kosovo War

References

Sources
 
 
 
 
 

Serbian war crimes in the Kosovo War
Massacres in the Kosovo War
1998 in Kosovo
Massacres in 1998
Anti-Albanian sentiment
September 1998 events in Europe
Family murders